The Wattasid dynasty (al-waṭṭāsīyūn) was a ruling dynasty of Morocco. Like the Marinid dynasty, its rulers were of Zenata Berber descent. The two families were related, and the Marinids recruited many viziers from the Wattasids. These viziers assumed the powers of the Sultans, seizing control of the Marinid dynasty's realm when the last Marinid, Abu Muhammad Abd al-Haqq, who had massacred many of the Wattasids in 1459, was murdered during a popular revolt in Fez in 1465.

Abu Abd Allah al-Sheikh Muhammad ibn Yahya was the first Sultan of the Wattasid Dynasty. He controlled only the northern part of Morocco, the south being divided into several principalities. The Wattasids were finally supplanted in 1554, after the Battle of Tadla, by the Saadi dynasty princes of Tagmadert who had ruled all of southern Morocco since 1511.

Overview
Morocco endured a prolonged multifaceted crisis in the 15th and early 16th centuries brought about by economic, political, social and cultural issues. Population growth remained stagnant and traditional commerce with the far south was cut off as the Portuguese occupied all seaports. At the same time, the towns were impoverished, and intellectual life was on the decline.

History
Morocco was in decline when the Berber Wattasids assumed power. The Wattasid family had been the autonomous governors of the eastern Rif since the late 13th century, ruling from their base in Tazouta (near present-day Nador). They had close ties to the Marinid sultans and provided many of the bureaucratic elite. While the Marinid dynasty tried to repel the Portuguese and Spanish invasions and help the kingdom of Granada to outlive the Reconquista, the Wattasids accumulated absolute power through political maneuvering. When the Marinids became aware of the extent of the conspiracy, they slaughtered the Wattasids, leaving only Abu Abd Allah al-Sheikh Muhammad ibn Yahya alive. He went on to found the Kingdom of Fez and establish the dynasty to be succeeded by his son, Mohammed al-Burtuqali, in 1504.

The Wattasid rulers failed in their promise to protect Morocco from foreign incursions and the Portuguese increased their presence on Morocco's coast. Mohammad al-Chaykh's son attempted to capture Asilah and Tangier in 1508, 1511 and 1515, but without success.

In the south, a new dynasty arose, the Saadian dynasty, which seized Marrakesh in 1524 and made it their capital. By 1537 the Saadis were in the ascendent when they defeated the Portuguese Empire at Agadir.  Their military successes contrast with the Wattasid policy of conciliation towards the Catholic kings to the north.

As a result, the people of Morocco tended to regard the Saadians as heroes,  making it easier for them to retake the Portuguese strongholds on the coast, including Tangiers, Ceuta and Maziɣen. The Saadians also attacked the Wattasids who were forced to yield to the new power.  In 1554, as Wattasid towns surrendered, the Wattasid sultan, Ali Abu Hassun, briefly retook Fez. The Saadis quickly settled the matter by killing him and, as the last Wattasids fled Morocco by ship, they too were murdered by pirates.

The Wattasid did little to improve general conditions in Morocco following the Reconquista.  It was necessary to wait for the Saadians for order to be reestablished and the expansionist ambitions of the kingdoms of the Iberian peninsula to be curbed.

Coinage
Known Wattasid coins include a few extremely rare gold coins and also square silver dirhams and half dirhams, still following the Almohad Caliphate standard of roughly 1.5 grams.

The dynasty

Wattasid Viziers
1420–1448: Abu Zakariya Yahya al-Wattasi
1448–1458: Ali ibn Yusuf
1458–1459: Yahya ibn Abi Zakariya Yahya

Wattasid Sultans
1472–1504: Abu Abd Allah al-Sheikh Muhammad ibn Yahya
1504–1526: Abu Abd Allah al-Burtuqali Muhammad ibn Muhammad
1526–1526: Abu al-Hasan Abu Hasan Ali ibn Muhammad
1526–1545: Abu al-Abbas Ahmad ibn Muhammad
1545–1547: Nasir ad-Din al-Qasri Muhammad ibn Ahmad
1547–1549: Abu al-Abbas Ahmad ibn Muhammad
1554–1554: Abu al-Hasan Abu Hasun Ali ibn Muhammad

Chronology of events 

According to the Treaty of Alcáçovas (1479), and to the Treaty of Tordesillas (1494), Spain recognized the kingdom as being in the Portuguese sphere of influence.
1485: Treaty with Spain: The sultanate agrees to not help the Kingdom of Granada, Spain agreed to not capture Moroccan ships in the Alboran Sea.
1488: Portuguese conquer Safi.
1491: Muhammad XIII, Sultan of Granada (El Zagal) went to Fez, but was captured and blinded.
1492: Arrival of Spanish Muslims and Jews.
1497: Spain captures Melilla
1502: Portugal captures Mazagan.
1505: Portugal captures Agadir.
1506: Portugal captures Mogador.
1511: Saadians capture Rabat.
1524: Saadians capture Marrakesh.
1541: Saadians capture Agadir.
1541: Saadians capture Safi.
1542: Hasan Hâsim captures Tetuan.
1548: The last wattasid king is captured by the Saadians.
1550: Saadians conquer Fez.

See also
Saadi dynasty
Marinid dynasty
List of rulers of Morocco

References

Sources

 
Dynasties of Morocco
Medieval Morocco
15th century in Morocco
16th century in Morocco
Berber dynasties
Countries in medieval Africa
Sunni dynasties
15th-century establishments in Africa
1550s disestablishments in Africa